Esmailabad (also Romanized as Esmā‘īlābād) is a village in Shahsavan Kandi Rural District, in the Central District of Saveh County, Markazi Province, Iran. At the 2006 census, its population was 27, in 8 families.

References 

Populated places in Saveh County